Paulino Reale Chirina (January 25, 1924 – March 29, 2012) was an Argentine Prelate of the Catholic Church.

Paulino Reale Chirina was born in Canicattini Bagni and was ordained a priest on December 5, 1948. Chirina was appointed bishop of the Diocese of Venado Tuerto on June 19, 1989 and ordained September 8, 1989. Chirina would retire from Venado Tuerto diocese on December 16, 2000.

See also
Diocese of Venado Tuerto

External links
Catholic-Hierarchy

20th-century Roman Catholic bishops in Argentina
21st-century Roman Catholic bishops in Argentina
1924 births
2012 deaths
Roman Catholic bishops of Venado Tuerto